Logan Township is a township in Marshall County, Iowa, USA.

History
Logan Township was created in 1869.

References

Townships in Marshall County, Iowa
Townships in Iowa